OnOffice is a quarterly architecture and design magazine launched in 2006 by publishing director Daren Newton, with a particular focus on the workplace, hospitality, and education sectors. It features news, criticism and case studies on architecture, interior and product design for the commercial industry.

OnOffice is owned by Media 10 LTD. The current editor is Jessica-Christin Hametner.

OnOffice is part of a wider Media 10 publication and event portfolio that includes ICON, The Clerkenwell Post, Clerkenwell Design Week and Design London.

Notes

In May 2013, the London Evening Standard quoted OnOffice features editor Jenny Brewer by Kate Burnett.

References

External links
 onoffice magazine
 Media 10

Architecture magazines
Visual arts magazines published in the United Kingdom
Monthly magazines published in the United Kingdom
Design magazines
English-language magazines
Magazines established in 2006
Mass media in Essex